Callum David Fraser-Darling (born 30 September 1963) is a former English cricketer. Fraser-Darling was a right-handed batsman who bowled right-arm medium-fast. He was born at Sheffield, Yorkshire.

Fraser-Darling made his first-class debut for Nottinghamshire against Cambridge University in 1984. He made ten further first-class appearances for the county, the last of which came against Oxford University in 1988. In his eleven first-class matches, he scored 242 runs at an average of 24.20, with a high score of 61. This score was the only time he passed fifty and came against Northamptonshire in 1986. With the ball, he took 17 wickets at a bowling average of 51.52, with best figures of 5/84. These figures were his only five wicket haul and came against Northamptonshire in 1986. He made his List A debut against Middlesex in the 1985 John Player Special League. He made fifteen further List A appearances, the last of which came against Surrey in the 1988 Refuge Assurance League. In his sixteen List A appearances, took 18 wickets at an average of 26.38, with best figures of 3/23. With the bat, he scored just 60 runs at an average of 8.57, with a high score of 11.

He left Nottinghamshire at the end of the 1988 season, soon after he pursued a career as a police officer. He still serves today as a Police Constable with Nottinghamshire Constabulary. Since 1989 he has represented the British Police cricket team.

References

External links
David Fraser-Darling at ESPNcricinfo

1963 births
Living people
Cricketers from Sheffield
English cricketers
English cricketers of 1969 to 2000
Nottinghamshire cricketers
British police officers